Insulasaurus traanorum is a species of skink. It is endemic to Palawan in the Philippines.

References

Insulasaurus
Reptiles of the Philippines
Endemic fauna of the Philippines
Fauna of Palawan
Reptiles described in 2010
Taxa named by Rafe M. Brown
Taxa named by Arvin Cantor Diesmos
Taxa named by Charles W. Linkem